Willem de Vos (c. 1593 – c. 1629) was a Flemish Baroque painter from Antwerp.

Biography
He was a nephew of the painter Maerten de Vos and his students included Justus Sustermans. His portrait was engraved by Anthony van Dyck for his iconography series. He is mentioned in Cornelis de Bie's book of artists as Guiliam de Vos.

References

Flemish Baroque painters
Artists from Antwerp
1590s births
1629 deaths
Year of birth uncertain
Year of death uncertain